Mary West (born 1945/46) is an American entrepreneur and philanthropist, the co-founder of West Corporation.

Early life
Mary West has a high school diploma, but never attended college. She grew up in Miami, and moved to Omaha part way through high school.

Career
In 1978, with her husband Gary, she co-founded WATS Telemarketing in the garage of their house in Omaha, Nebraska. They sold WATS in 1980 and in 1986 she founded West TeleServices which they took public in 1996.

In 2008, she and her husband had a combined net worth of $2.2 billion.

She owned 10% of West Corporation, a publicly traded telecommunications services provider headquartered in Omaha which was taken private in 2017 as a subsidiary of Apollo Global Management .

Philanthropy
They have given away in excess of $400 million to "senior citizen wellness and cutting the nation's health care costs".

Personal life
She is married to Gary West, and they live in San Diego. The Wests own Thoroughbred racing horses Maximum Security, Game Winner, and New Year's Day.

References

1940s births
Living people
People from Omaha, Nebraska
People from San Diego
Businesspeople from Nebraska
American company founders
American women company founders
American racehorse owners and breeders
American philanthropists